Anarsia sciotona is a moth of the family Gelechiidae. It was described by Edward Meyrick in 1927. It is found in South Africa.

The larvae feed on the fruit of Mimusops capensis.

References

Endemic moths of South Africa
sciotona
Moths described in 1927
Moths of Africa